Stone is a village in Buckinghamshire, England.  It is located southwest of the town of Aylesbury, on the A418 road that links Aylesbury to Thame. Stone with Bishopstone and Hartwell is a civil parish within Buckinghamshire district and also incorporates the nearby settlements of Bishopstone and Hartwell.

The architect Clough Williams-Ellis designed the village hall in 1910.

Description
The village name is Anglo Saxon in origin, and refers literally to boundary stone or marker stone.  In the Domesday Book of 1086 the village was recorded as Stanes.

The village of Stone adjoins the village of Hartwell.

The parish church (www.stonedintonhartwell.com) is dedicated to St John the Baptist, and is dated 1273. The graveyard contains the grave of Admiral Smyth.

1806 description
In 1806, Magna Britannia described Stone as

STONE, in the hundred of Aylesbury and deanery of Wendover, lies nearly three miles west of Aylesbury, on the road to Thame. The manor was anciently in the family of Braci, afterwards in that of Whittingham. It has been since held for many years by the Lees with the adjoining manor of Hartwell, and is now the property of the Rev. Sir George Lee bart.

The parish church which was consecrated in 1273, retains some vestiges of the architecture of that period. The rectory was given by the Braci family to the priory of Oseney. By the act of parliament which passed for inclosing this parish in 1776, it appears that the Lees were entitled to the great tithes of Southwarp in Stone, and the earl of Chesterfield to those of the remainder of the parish. Allotments of land were then assigned to the impropriators and to the vicar, who was entitled to the tithes of hay. Sir George Lee is patron and incumbent of the vicarage.

Astronomical observatory
In 1839, John Lee and the Royal Astronomical Society jointly owned the advowson of the parish. They appointed amateur scientist and Fellow of the Royal Society, the Rev. Joseph Bancroft Reade as vicar. Reade served as incumbent until 1859, establishing a school and an astronomical observatory, and performing pioneering work in the early development of photography.

Village school
Stone Church of England Combined School is voluntary controlled, mixed primary school with approximately 180 pupils aged between four and eleven. The school's catchment area includes the nearby villages of Bishopstone and Hartwell, and children transfer to the school from Dinton Church of England School, at the age of seven. The school dates from 1871, but most of the present buildings date from 1973 when a major programme of building work provided a hall, new classrooms, a library, changing rooms, offices and an extended playground. The current headteacher is Debbie Morrison. In 2006 the school was judged to be "satisfactory" and a 2007 Monitoring Report identified "good progress" in improving the curriculum and teaching. In 2019 the school achieved a ‘Good’ rating from Ofsted. In 2018 the school's Key Stage 2 results exceeded the England average.

St. John's Hospital
In the early 19th century an asylum (later known as St. John's Hospital) was opened in Stone for people with disabilities or mental illnesses.  It was closed in 1991, and the vast expanse of land has since been given over to a new housing estate. All that remains are the staff houses and the grade-II asylum chapel.

World War II prisoner of war camp
During World War II, a Prisoner of War camp was located in Sedrup, a hamlet near Stone (Camp No. 36 Hartwell Dog Track).

The camp was known to house Italian prisoners from 1942 to 1946 and consisted mostly of tents with one hut. A 1946 RAF aerial photo of the site shows camp buildings at Grid reference SP797121 , on what is now the Meadoway housing estate adjacent to Sedrup Lane. Remains of the camp were still evident on the site in the 1950s.

References

 History and topography of Buckinghamshire: comprising a general survey of the county, preceded by an epitome of the early history of Great Britain Author James Joseph Sheahan, Publisher Longman, Green, Longman, and Roberts, 1862, Stone pages 198–204  -

External links

Stone with Bishopstone and Hartwell Parish Council (SBHPC)
Stone Church of England Combined School
Parish Website (Parochial)

Villages in Buckinghamshire
Aylesbury Vale